Karen Stitt, a 15-year-old student at Palo Alto High School, was sexually assaulted and stabbed to death in Sunnyvale, California, on September 3, 1982. Stitt's murder went unsolved for nearly 40 years until forensic genealogy, the same technology used to catch the Golden State Killer, helped authorities to identify her alleged killer, Gary Gene Ramirez. Ramirez was arrested for Stitt's killing at his home in Makawao on the Island of Maui, Hawaii, on August 2, 2022.

Murder 
On September 2, 1982, Stitt took a local bus to visit her boyfriend in Sunnyvale. After spending the evening together, Stitt's boyfriend walked her to the bus stop for the trip home around midnight. Later that morning, her nude body was found dumped at the base of a wall of a nearby business by a delivery truck driver. Stitt's wrists were bound with her shirt and her jacket was tied around her left ankle. She had been raped and stabbed 59 times.

Investigation 
Stitt's murder went unsolved for nearly 40 years. Stitt's boyfriend was considered a suspect but was eventually cleared by forensic DNA analysis in the early 2000s. In 2019, a detective with the Sunnyvale Department of Public Safety began working with an expert in investigative genetic genealogy to identify the perpetrator. In 2021, the genealogist told detectives that the killer was likely one of four brothers from Fresno, California. Gary Gene Ramirez was one of them.

In April 2022, the Sunnyvale detective obtained a DNA sample from a child of Gary Ramirez. The DNA revealed there was a "high probability" that the child's father was the killer. On August 2, 2022, the 75-year-old Ramirez was arrested at his home in Makawao on the Island of Maui, Hawaii.
On August 10, 2022, Gary Ramirez appeared in court in Maui and agreed to be extradited to Santa Clara County, California.

References 

1982 in California
1982 murders in the United States
September 1982 events in the United States